Dennis Lemke (born 8 March 1989) is a German footballer who most recently played as a midfielder for VSG Altglienicke in the Regionalliga Nordost.

Career
After playing youth football for various clubs in his hometown of Berlin, Lemke joined Eintracht Braunschweig in the 3. Liga from Hertha BSC's reserve side in 2010. At Braunschweig, Lemke made his professional debut on 21 September 2010 in a league game against FC Rot-Weiß Erfurt, but could not establish himself in the team afterwards. He subsequently left Braunschweig at the end of the season. After a short stint at Carl Zeiss Jena Lemke signed a contract with 3. Liga side SV Babelsberg 03 in 2011. In 2013, he transferred to the Dutch Eredivisie club RKC Waalwijk. In January 2014, Lemke rejoined his former team SV Babelsberg 03 on a free transfer after he had not been able to impress RKC Waalwijk. Half a season later, he signed for Hessen Kassel.

References

External links
 

1989 births
Living people
German footballers
Footballers from Berlin
Association football midfielders
3. Liga players
Regionalliga players
Hertha BSC II players
Eintracht Braunschweig players
Eintracht Braunschweig II players
FC Carl Zeiss Jena players
SV Babelsberg 03 players
RKC Waalwijk players
KSV Hessen Kassel players
VSG Altglienicke players
German expatriate footballers
German expatriate sportspeople in the Netherlands
Expatriate footballers in the Netherlands